The San Antonio Spurs are an American professional basketball team based in San Antonio, Texas. They are a member of the Southwest Division of the Western Conference in the National Basketball Association (NBA). The franchise was founded as the Dallas Chaparrals of the American Basketball Association (ABA) in 1967. The team suffered from poor attendance and general disinterest by fans in Dallas, and the name "Dallas" was dropped in favor of "Texas" during the 1970–71 season in an attempt to make the team regional. This also proved to be a failure, and the team returned full-time to use "Dallas" for the 1971–72 season. The team was put up for sale after missing the playoffs in the 1972–73 season. The team was acquired by a group of 36 San Antonio businessmen, led by Angelo Drossos and Red McCombs, who relocated the team to San Antonio, Texas and renamed it to Spurs. In 1976, the ABA folded, threatening the future of San Antonio's sole professional sports franchise. The NBA, however, decided to admit four ABA teams into the league, including the Spurs, along with the Denver Nuggets, the Indiana Pacers and the New York Nets.

There have been 18 head coaches for the San Antonio Spurs. The franchise won their first NBA championship in the 1999 NBA Finals coached by Gregg Popovich. The Spurs won four additional NBA championships in 2003 NBA Finals, 2005 NBA Finals, 2007 NBA Finals and 2014 NBA Finals under Popovich. Popovich is the franchise's all-time leader in both regular season and playoff games coached and wins. Larry Brown is the only member of the franchise that has been inducted into the Basketball Hall of Fame as a coach. Bob Bass, who has coached with the Spurs for four terms, leads the franchise in most terms coached. Cliff Hagan, Max Williams, Bill Blakeley, Dave Brown, Morris McHone, Jerry Tarkanian and Popovich spent their entire coaching careers with the Spurs.

Key

Coaches

Notes
 A running total of the number of coaches of the Chaparrals/Spurs. Thus, any coach who has two or more separate terms as head coach is only counted once.
 Each year is linked to an article about that particular NBA season, except for the seasons spent in the ABA.

References
General

Specific

Lists of National Basketball Association head coaches by team

head coaches